Fayette (also Fayette Station) is an unincorporated community in Fayette County, West Virginia, United States.  Its elevation is 919 feet (280 m).

References

Unincorporated communities in Fayette County, West Virginia
Unincorporated communities in West Virginia